AS Saint-Etienne won Division 1 season 1974/1975 of the French Association Football League with 58 points.

Participating teams

 Angers SCO
 SEC Bastia
 Bordeaux
 RC Lens
 Lille
 Olympique Lyonnais
 Olympique de Marseille
 FC Metz
 AS Monaco
 FC Nantes
 OGC Nice
 Nîmes Olympique
 Paris Saint-Germain FC
 Red Star Paris
 Stade de Reims
 Stade Rennais FC
 AS Saint-Etienne
 FC Sochaux-Montbéliard
 RC Strasbourg
 Troyes AF

League table

Promoted from Division 2, who will play in Division 1 season 1975/1976
 AS Nancy: Champion of Division 2, winner of Division 2 group B
 US Valenciennes-Anzin: Runner-up, winner of Division 2 group A
 Olympique Avignonnais: Third place, winner of barrages

Results

Top goalscorers

References

 Division 1 season 1974-1975 at pari-et-gagne.com

Ligue 1 seasons
French
1